The Peugeot ROA or RD is an Iranian made car (by Iran Khodro Co). It is a developed version of the Peugeot RD1600. The car is a combination of Paykan and Peugeot 405. The body of ROA is a copy from Peugeot 405 and its engine and chassis are developed and modified from Iran Khodro's Paykan's chassis. Contrary to all other Peugeot 405 versions, the ROA is a rear-wheel drive car.

Engine
Technically wise, The engine is the Rootes 1.6 Hillman Avenger (which were used on Paykans since late 70s) and was mated to the Hunter drivetrain and suspension.

A revised model released in 2010 known as Peugeot ROA uses 1,700 cc CNG engine. In older models, Iran Khodro used a modified version of the Paykan's 1.6-litre engine.

The engine specifications are as follows:

 Engine type: Inline-four-cylinder; four-stroke; 1,599 cc (1,697 cc)
 No. of bearings: 5
 Bore: 87.35 mm (1600-1700)
 Stroke: 66.7 mm (1600)
 Cylinder head: Aluminum
 Engine block: Cast iron
 Maximum power:  at 5,000 rpm (1700)
 Maximum torque: 135 Nm at 3,000 rpm (1700)
 Compression ratio: 9.5:1 (1700)
 Ignition sequence: 1-3-4-2

References

 Peugeot Roa users' manual, Iran Khodro Co.

Cars of Iran
Rear-wheel-drive vehicles
2000s cars
2010s cars